Hudun is a town in Hudun District, Somaliland.

Hudun may also refer to:

 Hudun District, Somaliland
 Emperor Mo of Jin (1200-1234), with the personal name "Hudun" (呼敦)
 Hu dun pao (虎蹲砲; Crouching Tiger weapon), two different ancient weapons, a trebuchet and a cannon

See also

 Hu (disambiguation)
 Dun (disambiguation)
 Crouching Tiger (disambiguation), including 虎蹲
 Wohu (disambiguation) including 臥虎 (crouching tiger)
 Hundun